Paris is a 2006 compilation of French chanson music by label Putumayo.

Track listing 
All tracks are performed by their respective composers, unless indicated otherwise.
 Au Café de la Paix - 4:03 (Thomas Fersen)
 From the 1995 album Les Ronds de Carotte.  Produced by Warner Music France.
 Samba de Mon Cœur Qui Bat - 3:52 (Performed by Coralie Clément, written by Benjamin Biolay)
 From the 2002 album Salle des pas Perdus.  Produced by EMI Music France.
 Dites Moi Tu - 4:42 (Performed by Karpatt, written by Fred Rollat)
 From the 2002 album A L'Ombre du Ficus.  Produced by  Productions Speciales.
 Quelqu'un M'a Dit - 2:43 (Performed by Carla Bruni, written by performer and Lamonde Carax)
 From the 2002 album Quelqu'un M'a Dit.  Produced by Naive Records.
 Je Reste au Lit - 3:53 (Performed by Pascal Parisot)
 From the 2000 album Rumba.  Produced by Epic Records France.
 Jardin d'Hiver - 2:56 (Performed by Keren Ann, written by Benjamin Biolay, Keren Ann Zeidel)
 From the 2000 album La Biographie de Luka Philpsen.  Produced by EMI France
 Serre Moi - 3:46 (Performed by Tryo, written by Christophe Mali)
 From the 2003 album Grain de Sable.  Produced by Yelen Musiques.
 Lettre A P... - 3:29 (Performed by Paris Combo, written by Belle du Berry and David Lewis)
 From the 2001 album Attraction.  Produced by Universatl France.
 L'ongle - 2:59 (Performed by Presque Oui, written by Thibaud Defever and Marie-Hélène Picard)
 From the  2005 album Sauvez les Meubles.  Produced by Association Presque Oui.
 Ta P'tite Flamme - 3:52 (Amélie-Les-Crayons)
 From the 2005 album Et Pourquoi les Crayons.  Produced by Neomme.
 Les Pages - 2:37 (Performed by Myrtille, written by performer and Vanessa Gillet)
 From the 2004 album Murmures.  Produced by Universal France.
 Carpe Diem - 3:31 (Guillaume Aldebert)
 From the 2004 album "L'Année du Singe.  Produced by Warner Music France.

References

2006 compilation albums
World music compilation albums
Compilation albums by French artists